Nokian may refer to:

 Nokian Tyres
 Nokian Footwear
 Nokian moderator